George Johnson (1626–1683), of Bowden Park, Lacock, Wiltshire, was an English politician.

He was a reader and treasurer of the Middle Temple and was a judge.

He became a Member (MP) of the Parliament of England for Devizes on 30 October 1669 and 1681.

He was married to Mary Oeils, niece of the famed doctor, Baldwin Hamey the elder. He was the father of author and priest James Johnson and grandfather of James Johnson, Bishop of Gloucester and of Worcester.

References

1626 births
1683 deaths
People from Wiltshire
English MPs 1661–1679
English MPs 1681